Oaklands School is a community secondary school located in Bethnal Green, London Borough of Tower Hamlets, England. The school serves about 905 students aged 11–18.

References

External links
 

Secondary schools in the London Borough of Tower Hamlets
Educational institutions with year of establishment missing
Community schools in the London Borough of Tower Hamlets
Bethnal Green